Buonamici is an Italian surname. Notable people with the surname include:

 Francesco Buonamici (disambiguation), several people
 Giovan Francesco Buonamici (1692–1759), Italian architect and painter of the Baroque period
 Giuseppe Buonamici (1846–1914), Italian composer, pianist and musicologist
 Lazarus Buonamici (1479–1552), Italian Renaissance humanist

See also
 Suzanne Bonamici 

Italian-language surnames